Mickleton could refer to:

Places in England
Mickleton, County Durham, in Teesdale (historically in the North Riding of Yorkshire)
Mickleton, Gloucestershire

Places in the USA
Mickleton, New Jersey